Bruce Brian Hoani Cribb (born 27 June 1946) is a former speedway rider from New Zealand, who rode in the UK for several teams in a career spanning over twenty years.

Cribb was born in Palmerston North, where he began riding, before joining the Poole Pirates in 1965. In 1969 and 1970, he represented New Zealand in tests with England, and in 1971, he rode for Great Britain in matches with Poland. He won the New Zealand Championship in 1972, and was a member of the New Zealand team that won the World Team Cup in 1979.

From the 1970s to 1988, and again in the mid-1990s, he competed in ice speedway events and rode in three World ice speedway finals.

Since retiring he had a speedway business which closed as he finally finished ice speedway, then worked in engineering (machine shop). Other work includes working as service manager in motorcycle shops, porting cylinder heads for car engine builders for road and race, then a motorcycle service repair, until retiring in 2010.

Bruce has three grown children in Sydney NSW Australia - two daughters, Justine and Danielle, a son, Krista, and three grandchildren, Chester, Scarlet and Keira. His long-term partner, Irene, died in 2015.

Bruce has written about racing in his book "Cribby Story Book" containing many anecdotes. He also has his own Facebook page.

Speedway World Final appearances

World Team Cup
 1979 -  London, White City Stadium (with Ivan Mauger / Larry Ross / Mitch Shirra / Roger Abel) - Winner - 35pts (5)

Ice World Championship
1978 –  Assen, 18th
1988  Eindhoven, 16th

References

External links 
 Rider profile - Cradley Heath Speedway website
 https://www.worldspeedwayriders.org/rider/41/bruce-cribb
 https://www.facebook.com/bruce.cribb?fref=search&__tn__=%2Cd%2CP-R&eid=ARDEBrJ1BNduSNPAG3Qa4yifpfDx4orjRvUGMi6mCmD-vNZ85MNJ6cOXVYGpE7cT9g_q83LrZqmNZtcm

1946 births
Living people
New Zealand speedway riders
Sportspeople from Palmerston North
Wolverhampton Wolves riders
Berwick Bandits riders
Birmingham Brummies riders
Exeter Falcons riders
Cradley Heathens riders
Poole Pirates riders
Bristol Bulldogs riders
Oxford Cheetahs riders